The Indonesia national football team represents Indonesia in international football. They were the first Asian team to participate in the FIFA World Cup, particularly in the 1938 edition as the Dutch East Indies. The 6–0 loss to eventual finalists Hungary in the first round remains the nation's only appearance in the World Cup. Thus, Indonesia holds the World Cup record as the team with the fewest matches played (1) and one of the teams with the fewest goals scored (0).

The team's only appearance in the Olympics was in 1956. Indonesia qualified for the AFC Asian Cup on five occasions and have never progressed beyond the group stage on the previous four tournaments. Indonesia achieved the bronze medal at the 1958 Asian Games in Tokyo. The team has reached the AFF Championship final ties on six occasions and has never won the tournament. They share a local rivalry with ASEAN teams including the one against Malaysia which is somewhat pertained to cultural and political reasons.

History

Beginning 
The matches involving sides from the Dutch East Indies (or Netherlands East Indies) were organised by the Nederlandsch Indische Voetbal Bond (NIVB), or its successor, the Nederlandsch Indische Voetbal Unie (NIVU). The matches that were run prior to the nation's independence in 1945 are not recognised by PSSI.

The first recorded match that involved a team from the Dutch East Indies was a contest against a Singapore national team on 28 March 1921. The match was played in Batavia and the Dutch East Indies won with a final score of 1–0. This was followed by matches against an Australian XI in August 1928 (2–1 victory) and a team from Shanghai two years later (4–4 draw).

In 1934, a team from Java represented the Dutch East Indies in the Far Eastern Games that was played in Manila. After defeating the Japanese, 7–1, in its first match, the next two matches ended in defeats (2–0 to China and 3–2 to the host nation) resulting in a second-place tournament finish for the Java national team. Although not recognised by PSSI, these matches are treated by the World Football Elo ratings as the first matches involving the Indonesian national side.

The Dutch East Indies were the first Asian team to participate in the FIFA World Cup, when the team qualified for the 1938 tournament after Japan withdrew from the qualification heats. The 6–0 loss to Hungary, in the first round of the tournament in Reims, remains the nation's only appearance in the World Cup.

1950s–1984 
After the Second World War, followed by the Indonesian Revolution, a highlight of the football history of independent Indonesian team occurred at the 1956 Olympics in Melbourne. The team forced the Soviet Union to a nil-all draw, then lost 0–4 in the replay match. This remains the country's only appearance in the Olympics.

In 1958, the team tasted its first World Cup action as Indonesia in the qualifying rounds. The team defeated China in the first round, then subsequently refused to play its next opponents, Israel, for political reasons.

Indonesia won the bronze medal at the 1958 Asian Games where it beat India 4–1 in the third-place match. The team also drew 2–2 with East Germany in a friendly match.

The Indonesian team lifted the Merdeka Tournament trophy on three occasions (1961, 1962 and 1969). Indonesia were also champions of the 1968 King's Cup.

Indonesia returned to World Cup qualification competition in 1974; the team was eliminated in the first round, with only one win from six matches, against New Zealand. During the 1978 qualification heats, the Indonesian team won a single match out of four matches, against host team, Singapore. Four years later, in 1982, Indonesia recorded two victories in qualifying matches, against Chinese Taipei and Australia.

1985–1995 
The 1986 FIFA World Cup qualification round saw Indonesia advanced from the first round with four wins, one draw and one loss, eventually finishing at the top of its group. South Korea emerged victorious over Indonesia in the second round.

The team reached the semi-final of the 1986 Asian Games after beating United Arab Emirates in the quarter-finals. Indonesia then lost to hosts South Korea in the semi-finals and lost to Kuwait in the bronze medal match.

A milestone during this era was the gold medal victory at the Southeast Asian Games in both 1987 and 1991. In 1987, Indonesia beat Malaysia 1–0; while in 1991, it beat Thailand in a penalty shoot-out.

In the 1990 qualification, the team lost in the first round, with only one win against Hong Kong, three draws and two defeats. The team also only managed a single victory against Vietnam in the 1994 qualification round.

1995–2016

Asian Cup 
Indonesia's first appearance in the AFC Asian Cup was against United Arab Emirates in the 1996 AFC Asian Cup. During the tournament, Indonesia only scored a single point from a 2–2 draw against Kuwait in the first round.

The team's second appearance in the Asian Cup was in Lebanon in the 2000 AFC Asian Cup; again, the Indonesian team gained only one point from three games, and again, from a match against Kuwait that finished without a score from either side. Indonesia established a higher record in the 2004 AFC Asian Cup, beating Qatar 2–1 to record the team's first ever victory in the history of the tournament. The win was not enough for it to qualify for the second round, having fallen 0–5 to host China and 1–3 to Bahrain.

ASEAN Championship 
Indonesia reached the finals of ASEAN Football Championship on six occasions (2000, 2002, 2004, 2010, 2016, and 2020), albeit never managing to lift the trophy victoriously. The team's claim of regional titles came in the Southeast Asian Games of 1987 and 1991.

After the Withe era, the inability to fulfil the ASEAN target has been cited as the reason for Indonesia's "revolving door" in terms of team managers. Over the course of two years, the Indonesia's manager changed from Kolev to local coach Benny Dollo who was in turn sacked in 2010. The head coach position was then held by Alfred Riedl who failed to lift any cups and in July 2011 was then replaced by Wim Rijsbergen.

The 1998 Tiger Cup saw the group stage match between Thailand and Indonesia with both teams had already qualified for semi-finals but were also aware that the winner would have to face hosts Vietnam. Indonesia's Mursyid Effendi deliberately kicked the ball into the Indonesia's own goal as a Thailand's attacker ran towards the ball. FIFA fined both teams $40,000 for "violating the spirit of the game" while Effendi was banned from international association football for a lifetime. Indonesia then lost to Singapore in the semi-finals.

2012 and 2015–16 suspensions 
In March 2012, PSSI received a warning for the divided state of Indonesian football, whereby two separate leagues existed: the rebel Super League (ISL), which isn't recognised by PSSI or FIFA, and the Premier League (IPL). The National Sports Committee (KONI) encouraged PSSI to work collaboratively with Indonesian Football Savior Committee (KPSI) officials to rectify the situation but KONI chairman Tono Suratman stated in March 2012 that KONI will take over the beleaguered PSSI if matters are not improved. FIFA did not state whether Indonesia would face suspension, but on 20 March 2012, FIFA made an announcement. In the lead-up to 20 March 2012, PSSI struggled to resolve the situation and looked to its annual congress for a final solution. PSSI was given until 15 June 2012 to settle the issues at stake, notably the control of the breakaway league; failing this, the case was to be referred to the FIFA Emergency Committee for suspension. FIFA eventually set a new 1 December 2012 deadline and in the two weeks preceding the deadline, three out of four PSSI representatives withdrew from the joint committee, citing frustrations in dealing with KPSI representatives. However, FIFA stated that it would only issue a punishment to Indonesian football after the Indonesian national squad finished its involvement in the 2012 AFF Championship.

In 2013, the president of PSSI Djohar Arifin Husin signed a Memorandum of understanding (MoU) with La Nyalla Matalitti (KPSI-PSSI) that was initiated by FIFA and the AFC through the Asian Football Confederation's Task Force. Since then, the control of Indonesia Super League was taken by Joint committee to remain manageable by PT Liga Indonesia until the establishment of a new professional competition by the committee. This means the Indonesian players from ISL were able to play and join the national team. The PSSI called players from both football leagues, ISL and IPL to fortify the national team for Asian Cup qualifier of 2015. On 7 January 2013, PSSI announced a lists of 51 players from both side football leagues regardless of whether players from the breakaway Indonesia Super League (ISL) would make an appearance, allegedly ISL clubs were reluctant to release players because they doubted Djohar's leadership.

On 18 March 2013, PSSI held a congress at Kuala Lumpur, Malaysia. Both parties, PSSI and KPSI (breakaway group) solved their differences in four contentious points; such as; Reunification of two leagues; Revision of the PSSI Statutes; Reinstatement of the four expelled PSSI Executive Committee members La Nyalla Mattalitti, Roberto Rouw, Erwin Dwi Budiawan and Toni Apriliani; and agreement of all parties to the Memorandum of Understanding from 7 June 2012 on the list of delegates to the PSSI Congress based on the list of the Solo Congress of July 2011. The new PSSI called 58 players from both sides leagues (ISL and IPL) for the national squad. Rahmad Darmawan returned as the caretaker coach for the senior team and his friend, Jacksen F. Tiago was also in-charge as the assistant coach. Both Rahmat and Jaksen trimmed the 58 players initially called for national training to 28. The list would then be trimmed again to just 23 players for the Saudi Arabia match. Victor Igbonefo, Greg Nwokolo and Sergio van Dijk the three naturalised players were on the final list. On 23 March 2013, Indonesia was defeated 1–2 by Saudi Arabia at home. Boaz Solossa gave Indonesia the first goal at their campaign at AFC Asian Cup qualification; the home team started with the goal in the sixth minute but the Saudi Side fought back with the equaliser from Yahya Al-Shehri in the 14th minute before Yousef Al-Salem the scored what turned out to be the winner on 56th minute.

The Indonesian Football Association was suspended by FIFA because of government interference in the Southeast Asian country's national league on 30 May 2015.
The ban took effect immediately and meant that Indonesia would not be eligible to compete in the next round of qualifiers for the 2018 World Cup and 2019 Asian Cup, starting less than two weeks later. FIFA took action against Indonesia following a row between local government and the football association which has resulted in the cancellation of the domestic competition. The suspension was lifted at the 66th FIFA Congress. By then, hurried perpetration was done for Indonesia in order to get in touch for the upcoming 2016 AFF Championship where Indonesia eventually reached the final and once again fell to Thailand in process.

2017–2019 
Some weeks after finishing second in the ASEAN Football Championship, PSSI held a congress on 8 January 2017 in efforts to sign Luis Milla to handle their senior and U-22 team. Prior to the 2018 AFF Championship, Milla departed without any explanations, causing angers among Indonesian supporters. Indonesia crashed out from the group stage in 2018 AFF Championship led to the sacking of Bima Sakti. In order to prepare for the 2022 World Cup campaign, Indonesia signed Simon McMenemy with hope that his successful tenure with the Philippines could reinvigorate Indonesia's performance especially when Indonesia was grouped with three Southeast Asian rivals Malaysia, Thailand and Vietnam alongside UAE. Indonesia lost all four matches including a 2–3 home defeat to Malaysia despite having taken a 2–1 lead prior followed by a home loss to Vietnam for the first time ever in any competitive tournaments. On 6 November 2019, PSSI decided to sack McMenemy over the national team's deteriorating performance. Indonesia traveled to Malaysia and lost 0–2 to its rival and was officially eliminated from the 2022 World Cup qualification.

2021–present 
Following the failure to qualify for World Cup, PSSI appointed Shin Tae-yong as coach of Indonesia with hope to reinvigorate the team for the upcoming 2023 AFC Asian Cup qualification using the success of Park Hang-seo in Vietnam as an evidence for their appointment.

Under the management of Shin Tae-yong, the majority of senior teams were reshuffled and have many young players of whom majority were from under-23. Indonesia made it to the 2020 AFF Championship final with an average players age of 23.

On the Asian Cup qualification, Indonesia shockingly defeated host and former Asian champions, Kuwait, whom they have not defeated in 42 years, by the result 2–1, to the surprise of many people, the first-ever official win by a Southeast Asian team against a West Asian host since 2004 (when Thailand beat Yemen 3–0 in Sana'a during the 2006 FIFA World Cup qualification), and was the first time in the history that a Southeast Asian team had won against a Persian Gulf team as the visitor. Boosted by the win, Indonesia successfully qualified for the upcoming 2023 AFC Asian Cup after a 16-years absence.

Kit 

During the Dutch colonial era, the team competed as Dutch East Indies in international matches and played in an orange jersey, the national colour of the Netherlands. There are no official documents about the team's kit, only several black-and-white photos from the match against Hungary in the 1938 FIFA World Cup; but unofficial documents stated that the kit consisted of an orange jersey, white shorts and light blue socks.
Since Indonesia's independence, the kit consists red and white, the colours of the country's flag. A combination of green and white has also been used for the away kits and was used for the team's participation in the 1956 Summer Olympics in Melbourne, Australia, until the mid-1980s.

The 2010–2012 home kit became an issue when the team played against an opponent wearing an all-white uniform, since the socks were white instead of usual red. The solution was solved with a red-green-green combination (for away games) with green shorts and socks taken from the away kit, or initially an all-red uniform (for home games). After a home defeat in the 2014 World Cup third round qualifier match against Bahrain on 6 September 2011, the red shorts (with green application) were scrapped after its first outing and has never been used again. The red socks had white application on it, different from the red socks with green application worn during training. The combination of red-white-red was used some times in the future as the alternate home kit, for example on the subsequent home matches of the qualifiers against Qatar and Iran later that year.

On 12 November 2012, a week prior to the start of the 2012 AFF Suzuki Cup, Indonesia released its new home and away kits, again designed by Nike. The home kit returned to the red-white-red combination, as was the case in 2008, and the away kit consisted of a white-green-white combination. "The green colour brings a historical touch as the national team in the 1950s wore green shirts," Nike Indonesia marketing manager, Nino Priyambodo, said. "We hope it can inspire the national team for better performances in the future." The alternate shorts for this home kit were red shorts and green away shorts, while the away kit's alternate shorts were white shorts with red numbering from the default home shorts.

On 31 October 2014, Nike released Indonesia's home and away kits for the 2014 AFF Championship. The home shirt was red with white Nike logo and lines and green accent on the shoulders and tip of the sleeves, restricted by the white lines. The home kit consisted of red-white-red combination. The away shirt was white with green collar, sleeve tips, and Nike logo. The away kit consisted of white-green-white combination. Due to the FIFA sanction being imposed in 2015, the kits were used again in the 2016 AFF Championship and up until 2018 with two different fonts other than the 2014 Nike fonts used earlier.

On 31 May 2018, Nike released Indonesia's new home and away kits. The home shirt was red with golden Nike logo inspired from the country's national emblem, the Garuda Pancasila. The home kit consisted of red-white-red combination. The away shirt was white with green Nike logo. The away kit consisted of white-green-white combination.

Since 2020 Indonesia has been using new apparel from local brand Mills. The home kit consists of red-white-red combination with a silhouette in the front of the kit. The away kit consists white-green-white combination with a green horizontal strip across the front of the kit and a smaller white horizontal strip across the green strip. The third kit consists all black combination with golden strips and a silhouette in the front of the kit.

Indonesia also wear another apparel when they compete in international sport events such as Asian Games and Southeast Asian Games. In those events Indonesia wear Li-Ning instead of Nike or current apparel Mills. This is due to Asian Games and SEA Games being multi-sports events in which all of whose contingents are under the Indonesian National Olympic Committee (NOC).

Stadium 

Indonesia has played home matches at Gelora Bung Karno Stadium located within the Gelora Bung Karno Sports Complex, Gelora, Tanah Abang, Central Jakarta - Indonesia, the main home stadium for the Indonesia national football team. The stadium is mostly used for association football matches and has a seating capacity of over 77,193 spectators, though it has been able to hold more than that during special matches. The final of the 2007 AFC Asian Cup was held in this stadium. This stadium was once the 7th largest association football stadium in the world.

Jakarta International Stadium, the occasional home stadium for the Indonesia national football team, is a retractable roof football stadium under construction in Tanjung Priok, Jakarta - Indonesia. It will be the home ground for the occasional home of the Indonesia national football team, after an agreement between PSSI and PT JAKPRO to use the facility. The stadium will be able to host 82,000 spectators, making it the largest stadium in Indonesia.

Media coverage 
Indonesia team qualifiers for the 2022 FIFA World Cup (second round only) and 2023 AFC Asian Cup (play-off and third rounds) are broadcast by free-to-air public television network TVRI, Emtek's free-to-air television networks SCTV and Indosiar (from 2021), and Polytron's premium multiplatform network Mola TV, through 2022.

 MNC Media also shows the national team but from 2020 until 2023, MNC only covered the national team matches at AFF Championship and 2023 AFC Asian Cup (had qualified to the finals tournament) due to MNC-Lagardère (AFF Championship) and Football Marketing Asia (AFC Asian Cup) broadcasting rights partnership contract. However, TVRI, SCTV, Indosiar, and Mola TV bought the rights from PSSI only.

Results and fixtures

Matches in the last 12 months, and future scheduled matches

2022

2023

Coaches

Coaching history 
Caretaker managers are listed in italics.

 Johannes Mastenbroek (1934–1938)
 Choo Seng Quee &  Tony Wen (1951–1953)
 Antun Pogačnik (1954–1963)
 Ernest Alberth Mangindaan (1966–1970)
 Endang Witarsa (1970)
 Djamiaat Dalhar (1971–1972)
 Suwardi Arland (1972–1974)
 Aang Witarsa (1974–1975)
 Wiel Coerver (1975–1976)
 Suwardi Arland (1976–1978)
 Frans van Balkom (1978–1979)
 Marek Janota (1979–1980)
 Bernd Fischer (1980–1981)
 Harry Tjong (1981–1982)
 Sinyo Aliandoe (1982–1983)
 Muhammad Basri, Iswadi Idris & Abdul Kadir (1983–1984)
 Bertje Matulapelwa (1985–1987)
 Anatoli Polosin (1987–1991)
 Ivan Toplak (1991–1993)
 Romano Mattè (1993–1996)
 Andi M. Teguh (1996)
 Danurwindo (1996)
 Henk Wullems (1996–1997)
 Rusdy Bahalwan (1998)
 Bernhard Schumm (1999)
 Nandar Iskandar (1999–2000)
 Benny Dollo (2000–2001)
 Ivan Kolev (2002–2004)
 Peter Withe (2004–2007)
 Ivan Kolev (2007)
 Benny Dollo (2008–2010)
 Alfred Riedl (2010–2011)
 Wim Rijsbergen (2011–2012)
 Aji Santoso (2012)
 Nil Maizar (2012–2013)
 Rahmad Darmawan (2013)
 Jacksen F. Tiago (2013)
 Alfred Riedl (2013–2014)
 Benny Dollo (2015)
 Pieter Huistra (2015)
 Alfred Riedl (2016)
 Luis Milla (2017–2018)
 Bima Sakti (2018)
 Simon McMenemy (2019)
 Yeyen Tumena (2019)
 Shin Tae-yong (2020–present)

Players

Current squad 
The following 28 players were called up for friendly match against  on 25 and 28 March 2023. On the 17th of March Egy Maulana Vikri withdrew from the squad due to an injury and was replaced by Stefano Lilipaly.

Caps and goals are accurate as of 9 January 2023, after the match against .

Recent call-ups 
The following players have also been called up to the squad within the last 12 months.

Notes
PRE = Preliminary squad
SUS = Suspended
INJ = Withdrew from the roster due to an injury
UNF = Withdrew from the roster due to unfit condition
RET = Retired from the national team
WD = Withdrew from the roster for non-injury related reasons

Captains

Players record

Most appearances

Top goalscorers

Competitive record

FIFA World Cup

AFC Asian Cup

AFF Championship

Olympic Games

Asian Games

Southeast Asian Games

Honours

International
 FIFA World Cup
 Round of 16 (1) : 1938
Summer Olympics
 Quarter finals (1) : 1956

Continental
 Asian Games
  Bronze medal (1): 1958 
 Fourth Place (2): 1954, 1986

Regional
 AFF Championship
  Runner-up (6): 2000, 2002, 2006, 2010, 2016, 2020
  Third Place (1): 1998
  Fourth Place/Semifinalist (3): 1996, 2008, 2022
 Southeast Asian Games
  Champions/Gold medal (2): 1987, 1991
  Silver medal (2): 1979, 1997
  Bronze medal (3): 1981, 1989, 1999
 Fourth Place (3): 1977, 1985, 1993
Far Eastern Games
  Silver medal (1) : 1934

Exhibition tournaments
Pestabola Merdeka
  Champions (3):  1961, 1962, 1969
  Runner-up (2): 1957, 2006
  Third Place (1): 1958
Aga Khan Gold Cup
  Champions (1): 1961
South Vietnam Independence Cup
  Runner-up (1): 1962
King's Cup
  Champions (1): 1968
  Runner-up (2): 1969, 1984
Jakarta Anniversary Tournament
  Champions (1): 1972
  Runner-up (3): 1973,  1974,  1978
Pesta Sukan Cup
  Champions (1): 1972
President's Cup
  Runner-up (2): 1972, 1980
Merlion Cup
  Third Place (1): 1982
Indonesian Independence Cup
  Champions (3): 1987, 2000, 2008
  Runner-up (2): 1986, 1994
Myanmar Grand Royal Challenge Cup
  Runner-up (1): 2008
SCTV Cup
  Runner-up (1): 2012
Al Nakba Cup
  Third Place (1): 2012

Head-to-head record 

As of 9 January 2023 after match against

See also
 Indonesia national under-23 football team
 Indonesia national under-20 football team
 Indonesia national under-17 football team
 Indonesia women's national football team
 Indonesia national futsal team
 Indonesia national beach soccer team

Notes

References

External links 
 Official website
 Indonesia on FIFA

 
Asian national association football teams